Mau5ville: Level 1 (stylized as mau5ville: Level 1) is an extended play (EP) and compilation album by Canadian electronic music producer Deadmau5. It was released on July 13, 2018 through his record label Mau5trap. The release features "Monophobia", a collaboration with Australian singer and musician Rob Swire, with remixes, as well as original songs by DJs Getter and GTA. Two follow-up EPs, Mau5ville: Level 2 and Mau5ville: Level 3, were released in November 2018 and February 2019 respectively.

Background
Mau5ville: Level 1s release date was first revealed through various store pages on July 3, 2018. The cover art was also uploaded to Deadmau5's Twitter account. However, the EP was officially announced on July 12, 2018, the day before its final release on July 13, 2018. The Beatport exclusive version of the EP was released with two additional bonus mixes of "Monophobia". The EP is named after Deadmau5's former online server on the sandbox video game Minecraft.

The opening track, "Monophobia", serves as the return of long-time collaborator Rob Swire from Pendulum and Knife Party, who had previously collaborated with Deadmau5 on his song "Ghosts 'n' Stuff" in 2009. The song was also remixed by other artists who have released on the record label Mau5trap, including producers Attlas, Latroit, and Rinzen. A music video for "Monophobia" was released on Deadmau5's YouTube channel on July 16, 2018.

Track listing

Charts

Release history

Notes

References

2018 EPs
2018 compilation albums
Deadmau5 albums